Izmaylovo is a station on the Moscow Central Circle of the Moscow Metro that opened in September 2016.

Name
The station is named for the Izmaylovo District in which it is situated. The city changed the station name from Izmaylovsky Park shortly before the line opened.

Transfer
Passengers may make free, out-of-station transfers to Partizanskaya station in the Arbatsko-Pokrovskaya Line via an enclosed walkway over Vernisazhskaya Ulitsa.

Gallery

References

External links 
 mkzd.ru

Moscow Metro stations
Railway stations in Russia opened in 2016
Moscow Central Circle stations